Szeged LC was a Hungarian football club from the town of Szeged.

History
Szeged LC debuted in the 1999–2000 season of the Hungarian League, but withdrew during the winter break and were eliminated from the championship. The club dissolved in 2000.

Name Changes
 1998–2000: Szeged LC

References

 
Football clubs in Hungary
Sport in Szeged
1998 establishments in Hungary
Association football clubs established in 1998